Events in the year 1994 in Cyprus.

Incumbents 

 President: Demetris Christofias
 President of the Parliament: Yiannakis Omirou

Events 
Ongoing – Cyprus dispute

 12 – 27 February – Cyprus sent a delegation to compete at the 1994 Winter Olympics in Lillehammer, Norway.

Deaths

References 

 
1990s in Cyprus
Years of the 21st century in Cyprus
Cyprus
Cyprus
Cyprus